Acrocercops scoliograpta is a moth of the family Gracillariidae. It is known from India (Punjab).

References

scoliograpta
Moths described in 1922
Moths of Asia